The Beretta Rx4 is a rifle developed and manufactured by the Beretta Holding of Italy.

Details
The action is a gas-operated, rotating bolt, using the Auto-Regulated Gas-Operated system patented by Benelli.  The rifle uses STANAG magazines and can feature either a fixed stock or an adjustable stock.  The rifle is in the same "family" as the Beretta Px4 Storm pistol and the Cx4 Storm Carbine, but does not share working systems or parts with any of the previously mentioned guns. This weapon operates only in semi-automatic mode, and no selective-fire or otherwise full-automatic version of the Rx4 carbine is planned. Beretta is already developing a completely different new-generation assault rifle called the ARX-160. The Rx4 Storm is thus not currently in any military use, as it has not been intended to be, albeit one of its variants (the 12.5-inch barrel "Tactical" version with pistol grip and 5-position telescopic stock) has been intended primarily as a "patrol carbine" for police organizations and private security operators.

Manufactory
The Rx4 is the first .223 Remington carbine in Beretta's Storm-family. It is entirely and solely manufactured in the Benelli Armi
plant in Urbino, and marked "Beretta" as Benelli is part of the Beretta Holding and owned by Beretta since 1983; nonetheless, in Italy, the Rx4 Storm carbine is inscribed on the National Catalogue of Firearms (the list of firearms approved for civilian ownership by the Italian Ministry of Interior) as the Benelli Mr1. The samples sold in the United States are assembled at the Beretta-USA plant in Accokeek, Maryland with imported parts of Italian manufacture.

Variants
As of 2007, the weapon is available in a wide array of variants; available barrel lengths are 12.5” and 16 inches, with three different stocks available: standard hunting rifle stock, sporting stock with fixed buttstock and pistol grip, and tactical stock with pistol grip and 5-position telescoping buttstock.  The 12.5 inch barrel is threaded and features a removable muzzle brake.  The Rx4 has a MIL-STD-1913 “Picatinny” top rail, with side and bottom and fore-end rails optional.

The gas port is located just forward of the chamber where the gases are hotter and cleaner.

The Rx4 Storm has nine attachment points for slings to accommodate multiple carry options.  It does not require tools for disassembly.  When the last round fires, the bolt locks to the rear. A combat ghost ring sight, adjustable for windage and elevation, is standard.

Availability
The market availability of the different models of the Rx4 Storm carbine differs from country to country. The 12.5 inch variant with removable muzzle brake, which has been primarily intended as a Police patrol carbine, is normally on sale in Italy like all the other variants, while in the United States it is not yet available (December 2007) in any model to civilians. The 12.5 inch model may be sold by Beretta-USA only as a "Law Enforcement weapon", and all NFA rules apply to it, as its short barrel length restricts its civilian availability as a "Short Barreled Rifle" (any rifle with a barrel length less than 16 inches as described in the NFA Title 2), a category of firearms which is forbidden to own in certain States and that requires a BATFE Form 4 to be filed and a payment of $200. The strict regulations of the National Firearms Act are compounded by the Gun Control Act of 1968, which prohibits the importation of such firearms, on the grounds that they are not particularly suitable for or readily adaptable to sporting purposes.

See also
Beretta Px4 Storm
Beretta Cx4 Storm
Beretta Tx4 Storm

5.56×45mm NATO semi-automatic rifles
Rx4 Storm
Carbines